Eurycephalella is an extinct genus of frogs which existed in what is now Brazil during the Early Cretaceous (Aptian). It was named by Ana M. Báez, Geraldo J.B. Moura and Raúl O. Gómez in 2009, and the type species is Eurycephalella alcinae.

Discovery 
Eurycephalella was discovered within the limestone predominant Crato Formation of the Araripe Basin in northeastern Brazil. The specimen is the partial skeleton of an adult, and is in the collection of the Museum of Paleontology in Santana do Cariri.

Although the fossil was originally assigned to the genus Arariphrynus (Leal and Brito, 2006), it was later changed to Eurycephalella.

Description 
Eurycephalella alcinae was a carnivorous frog that lived in or around a large lake or "thermally stratified lagoon".

References 

Prehistoric amphibian genera
Early Cretaceous frogs
Aptian life
Cretaceous amphibians of South America
Early Cretaceous animals of South America
Cretaceous Brazil
Fossils of Brazil
Crato Formation
Fossil taxa described in 2009